Bishop Ireton High School is a Roman Catholic high school located in Alexandria, Virginia, less than one mile from Old Town Alexandria. The school was founded in 1964 by the Oblates of St. Francis de Sales, and named in honor of Peter Leo Ireton, Bishop of Richmond from 1945 to 1958.  The school originally admitted only male students. Bishop Ireton, more commonly known as "BI" or simply "Ireton", became coeducational in 1990 after the closing of sister school, St. Mary's Academy. In 2008, the Oblates withdrew their presence from Ireton and the school is now managed by the Roman Catholic Diocese of Arlington.

The patron of Bishop Ireton High School is St. Francis de Sales, a 16th Century apologist and writer of mystical theology, a Doctor of the Church, and patron saint of writers and journalists.

Administration
The school is administered by the Head of School, a presidential position responsible for institutional advancement. A Board of Governors appointed by the Bishop of Arlington serves as an advisory council to the Head of School. The Principal is the school's chief academic officer responsible for overseeing all student programs. Other members of the Senior Administrative team include the Chaplin/Director of Campus Ministry, the Director of  Advancement, the Director of Operations, the Director of Athletics, the Director of Admissions, and the Director of Finance. The Principal is also supported by the Assistant Principal for Academics and the Assistant Principal for Student Life.

Student Council Association (SCA)
Freshmen, Sophomores, Juniors, and Seniors are elected by their classmates and two upperclassmen (Juniors or Seniors) are elected as student body President and one Vice President. The class officers are organized as follows:
 One President and three or four officers for each class
The SCA meets once a week and plans important events, such as Homecoming Week, Adopt a Family, Dress Out Day Fundraisers, the Winter Ball, and the Lenten Service Drive. These students also have a prominent role in graduation, processing first carrying flags and gonfalons.

Academics

·        The school offers 22 Advanced Placement courses and 41 honors courses and two dual enrollment courses with Northern Virginia Community College.

·        More than 85% of Bishop Ireton faculty and staff have advanced degrees. Five hold a Ph.D.

·        The school's unique advisory program matches students and teachers in partnerships for all four years.

·        Academic Enrichment is a program for students needing personalized learning and extra academic support to help reach their potential.

·        Nine Ireton students have been appointed to U.S. Service Academies the last two years.

·        The Class of 2018 received nearly $20 million in scholarships to colleges and universities with 100% college acceptance.

Athletics
Bishop Ireton competes in the WCAC Washington Catholic Athletic Conference and VISAA, Virginia Independent Schools Athletic Association. Several athletes each year attend college on athletic scholarships.
Among the many sports played at Ireton are football, field hockey, cheerleading, cross country, basketball, baseball, lacrosse, track and field, wrestling, ice hockey, golf, swimming & diving, volleyball, soccer, tennis, softball, rowing, water polo, and indoor track. Almost 9 out of every 10 students at Ireton will have been engaged in an athletic activity at least once in their high school career.

Mascot 
Cardinals

Fine and Performing Arts

Music 
The school offers a variety of musical groups including: the Symphonic Wind Ensemble, Concert Band, Jazz and String Ensembles, Guitar Performers, and the Choir. In 2016, the Symphonic Wind Ensemble and members of the Concert Choir played in the Concert Hall of the Kennedy Center. Each year over Spring Break, the Wind Ensemble has the honor of performing internationally. Recent trips have taken the group to France, Spain, Italy, and Germany. The 2018 tour will take the Wind Ensemble back to France. Past performance venues for Bishop Ireton Chamber Ensembles have included the White House, French Embassy, National Building Museum, Lee Fendall House, and the Andrew W. Mellon Auditorium.  On April 28, 2008, singer-songwriter Taylor swift performed at the schools auditorium

Theater

Bishop Ireton Theatre Arts program stages two main stage shows each season - one play and one musical. In addition, the student-run Bishop Ireton Drama Club holds many events throughout the year, including a trip to New York. Hundreds of students have passed through Ireton's drama program and many students are currently enrolled in acting, stage crafts, and costuming classes. Other drama events include the annual Evening of the Arts where student-directed one acts are displayed. Bishop Ireton's Garwood Whaley Auditorium is home to the Bishop Ireton theatre program. The 783-seat space is a fully equipped theatrical venue that plays host to many other functions within the school.

Studio Art 
Since 1964, Bishop Ireton has been known for producing artists across many media and is a haven for helping students discover their creative potential. The school offers a robust arts curriculum, including:

 Principles of Art
 Advanced Painting and Drawing
 AP Studio Art 2-D Designs
 AP Studio Art Drawing
 Honors Portfolio Preparation / Senior Studio
 AP Art History

Student life 
Each year celebrations include Spirit Week, Homecoming, Feast Week, Winter Ball (all proceeds benefit BI's sister school, the Louverture-Cleary School in Haiti. Mass is celebrated each morning in the chapel. At least once per month the entire school community gathers for Mass in the auditorium. Students participate in Christian Service and retreats all four years. Monthly dress-out days raise money for local and international charitable organizations. Student leaders plan retreats, lead school prayer services, organize tutoring for their peers, and volunteer in the community.

Clubs 

Almost every Bishop Ireton student participates in at least one of the nearly 60 clubs on campus, including Women in Science, Coding Club, and Girls Who Code. The school has hosted an annual regional Hackathon since 2017.

Senior All Night Grad Party
This is a signature annual event held off campus the evening of graduation. Recent graduates enjoy swimming, laser tag, a casino, obstacle courses, karaoke, and prizes. It is generally not over until 5:30 the following morning.

Notable alumni

Jon Carroll, Grammy Award Winning Songwriter and Performer (Starland Vocal Band).
Dave Grohl from the Foo Fighters and Nirvana (attended freshman and part of sophomore years)
Bob McDonnell, former Governor of Virginia
Carlos G. Muñiz, Justice on the Supreme Court of Florida
Charlie Raphael, former professional soccer player.
Andrew Rodriguez, winner of the 2011 Campbell Trophy, given annually to the top scholar-athlete in NCAA Division 1 football
 Chris Adler, drummer from band Lamb of God (band)
John Olson, Minnesota politician 
J. Brett Blanton, 12th Architect of the Capitol

References

External links

 

Educational institutions established in 1964
Catholic secondary schools in Virginia
Northern Virginia Scholastic Hockey League teams
Schools in Alexandria, Virginia
Roman Catholic Diocese of Arlington
1964 establishments in Virginia